Moshannon Valley Correctional Center or Moshannon Valley Processing Center is an Immigration & Customs Enforcement building located in Philipsburg, Pennsylvania, privately operated by the GEO Group under contract with the U.S. Immigration and Customs Enforcement. It has a capacity of 1,878. It originally closed on March 31, 2021 after the Federal Bureau of Prisons decided to not exercise the contract renewal option. The facility opened back up in November 2021 after receiving a contract with ICE.

History
The facility began accepting prisoners in April 2006  and continued to expand up until originally closing in 2021. At opening it was the first privately owned prison in Pennsylvania. It housed low-security, nonviolent criminal aliens who had less than 5 years on their remaining sentences.

In September 2013 the future of Moshannon Valley's continued operation was said to hinge on a federal contractual decision between this facility and the Northeast Ohio Correctional Center, privately run by the Corrections Corporation of America near Youngstown, Ohio.

In December 2014 Moshannon Valley's contract was renewed by the Federal government for 5 years, with 5 one year options after that for a total of 10 years.

In August 2016, Justice Department officials announced that the FBOP would be phasing out its use of all contracted facilities, on the grounds that private prisons provided less safe and less effective services with no substantial cost savings.  The agency expected to allow current contracts on its thirteen remaining private facilities to expire.

In January 2021, it was announced that the Federal Bureau of Prisons had decided to not exercise the contract renewal option for the facility, and would allow the contract to end on March 31, 2021. GEO was expected to market the building to other federal and state agencies. Moshannon Valley Economic Development Partnership President Bryan Bennett said the closing was the worst economical news for the area in years, saying "The upcoming closure of the GEO Moshannon Valley facility is the worst economic news that we have received in our region in over twenty years. MVEDP believes it essential that local leaders now work with GEO Group representatives to determine if there will be any reuse opportunities."

In August 2021, it was revealed that the GEO Group had contracted the building to ICE (U.S. Immigration and Customs Enforcement) to become a detention facility. Interest in the facility from ICE came when they lost a major contract with York County Jail last year. On September 28, 2021, the Clearfield County Commissioners approved a five-year contract that began in November 2021 and will run through November 2026. The facility will see some upgrades such as new 'no-climb' perimeter fencing. Local officials predict approximately 200 jobs were restored to the area with the potential for an additional 100 if the facility reaches capacity. Once released, detainees will be taken to either Pittsburgh or Philadelphia for travel to their final destination. The detainees will spend an average of 2–4 weeks at the institution before being relocated.

Notable inmates

See also
 List of detention sites in the United States

References

GEO Group
Prisons in Pennsylvania
Buildings and structures in Clearfield County, Pennsylvania
2006 establishments in Pennsylvania